was a town located in Minamitakaki District, Nagasaki Prefecture, Japan.

As of 2003, the town had an estimated population of 8,483 and a density of 294.55 persons per km². The total area was 28.80 km².

On March 31, 2006, Nishiarie, along with the towns of Arie, Fukae, Futsu, Kazusa, Kitaarima, Kuchinotsu and Minamiarima (all from Minamitakaki District), was merged to create the city of Minamishimabara.

External links
 Minamishimabara official website 

Dissolved municipalities of Nagasaki Prefecture